Alexandre Henrique Borges Guimarães (born 7 November 1959) is a Costa Rican football manager and former player who played as a midfielder. He is the current manager of América de Cali.

Born and raised in Brazil, Guimarães played for the Costa Rica national team in the 1990 FIFA World Cup, and was also their manager in the 2002 and 2006 editions. He had successful runs with teams like Al Wasl in United Arab Emirates, Tianjin Teda in China and Deportivo Saprissa in Costa Rica. His son Celso Borges currently plays for Alajuelense.

Club career
Born in Maceió, Alagoas, in the northeast of Brazil, Guimarães moved to Costa Rica in 1971 at the age of twelve and became a Costa Rican citizen in 1980. He played basketball for Asturias but as a football player, Guimarães started his career at second division side Durpanel San Blas where he became the league's goalscorer with 16. He then played for top flight clubs Municipal Puntarenas, Deportivo Saprissa, and Turrialba.

He was national champion three times with Saprissa in 1982, 1988 and 1989 and scored 95 goals in 377 official matches.

International career
Guimarães made his debut for Costa Rica in a March 1985 friendly match against Canada and earned a total of 16 caps, scoring 2 goals. He represented his country in 5 FIFA World Cup qualification matches and played in three matches in the 1990 FIFA World Cup.

His final international was in that World Cup's Round of 16 match against Czechoslovakia.

International goals
Scores and results list Costa Rica's goal tally first.

Managerial career
After retiring as a player, he became one of the most successful coaches in Costa Rica's history. He started coaching Belén, then moved to Herediano in summer 1996, where he achieved good results with both teams. He was hired by Saprissa, where he worked for several years, winning three national tournaments with them. His last Costa Rican team was Cartaginés, whom he joined in June 2003, a stint that was catastrophic, ending with his dismissal in November 2003 as the team was almost relegated to the second tier and in financial troubles due to high salaries on players that did not show their quality. He has also coached several teams internationally, such as Comunicaciones of Guatemala, Irapuato and Dorados de Sinaloa in Mexico.

He is best known for his great achievements as a member of Costa Rica's national squad, and as a head coach, leading them to an almost perfect qualifier for the 2002 FIFA World Cup. Not having advanced to the second round, Guima was replaced as the head coach of the national team. Later he would regain his position, but was handed a National squad in a poor state. Still, he led Costa Rica's team to the 2006 World Cup, after which he quit from the squad, given the team's poor performance in the tournament.

On November 7, 2006, on his 47th birthday, Guimarães was chosen as the head coach for the Panama national football team but he was dismissed in June 2008.
In April 2009, he has moved to the Middle East to start a new challenge coaching the famous United Arab Emirates Club, Al Wasl FC, starting from the 2009/2010 Season. With Al Wasl he managed to win the Gulf Clubs Championship in a final against Qatar SC, the first and only international honour for this club. Then he moved on to Al Dhafra in 2010. In May 2011 he returned to Saprissa for a one-year spell.

On 1 June 2012, Chinese Super League side Tianjin Teda announced that they had officially signed Guimarães as new head coach after Croatian coach Josip Kuže was sacked, completing the first season with excellent results, emerging from the bottom of the table to near the first positions. Before his second season, the club suffered a sanction with -6 points due to irregularities in the mid-2000s years and the team had to battle for finishing in a comfortable position, which finally happened. Guimaraes didn't come to an agreement to renew the contract for the next season.

On 19 April 2016, the Indian Super League franchise Mumbai City FC signed Guimarães as their new head coach, replacing French international Nicolas Anelka. He left the role in August 2018.

On 17 June 2019, he was appointed manager of América de Cali. This same year he took América de Cali to win their 14th Colombian Championship, on December 7, 2019. The final was held over a 2-game tie against Junior de Barranquilla. The first leg was a no goal tie in Baranquilla. The 2nd leg was played in Cali, and saw America win 2–0.

Personal life
He is a son of doctor Luis de Souza Borges and María Alice Guimarães and has two brothers and a sister. He is married to Lina Mora and has two children, Mauro and Celso, who also plays for the Costa Rica national team and as of 2022 season for Costa Rican club Liga Deportiva Alajuelense.

References

External links
 
 Guima, un terco soñador  - Nación 

1959 births
Living people
Costa Rican people of Brazilian descent
People from Maceió
Costa Rican footballers
Association football midfielders
Puntarenas F.C. players
Deportivo Saprissa players
Liga FPD players
Costa Rica international footballers
1990 FIFA World Cup players
CONCACAF Championship-winning players
Costa Rican football managers
C.S. Herediano managers
Deportivo Saprissa non-playing staff
Deportivo Saprissa managers
Comunicaciones F.C. managers
Costa Rica national football team managers
Irapuato F.C. managers
Dorados de Sinaloa managers
Panama national football team managers
Al-Wasl F.C. managers
Tianjin Jinmen Tiger F.C. managers
Mumbai City FC head coaches
América de Cali managers
Liga MX managers
UAE Pro League managers
Chinese Super League managers
Indian Super League head coaches
2001 Copa América managers
2002 FIFA World Cup managers
2006 FIFA World Cup managers
Costa Rican expatriate football managers
Costa Rican expatriate sportspeople in Guatemala
Costa Rican expatriate sportspeople in Mexico
Costa Rican expatriate sportspeople in Panama
Costa Rican expatriate sportspeople in the United Arab Emirates
Costa Rican expatriate sportspeople in China
Costa Rican expatriate sportspeople in India
Costa Rican expatriate sportspeople in Colombia
Expatriate football managers in Guatemala
Expatriate football managers in Mexico
Expatriate football managers in Panama
Expatriate football managers in the United Arab Emirates
Expatriate football managers in China
Brazilian emigrants to Costa Rica
Naturalized citizens of Costa Rica
Mumbai City FC managers